Greg Palmer (May 1947 – May 8, 2009) was an American writer and Emmy Award-winning television producer and reporter.
Greg Palmer was born in Seattle and raised on Mercer Island near Seattle, WA in May 1947 to attorney Harvard Palmer and his wife Gertrude, a homemaker.

Greg Palmer died on May 8, 2009, of lung cancer 

and is survived by his wife of 40 years Cathryn Crosetto Palmer, two sons, Ira Palmer, 30, and Ned Palmer, 27, both of Seattle.

Greg Palmer worked at and freelanced for several Seattle broadcasters and newspapers, including KING-TV, KCTS-TV, Crosscut, Seattle Weekly and The Seattle Times.

Television and video productions
 "Death: The Trip of a Lifetime"
 "Vaudeville: An American Masters Special"
 "The perilous fight: America's World War II" in color, written and produced by Greg Palmer

Plays
 "The Falcon" based on a Georgian fairy tale
 "Puss in Boots"
 "Betsey Green the Mushroom Queen"
 "Snow White and Family Dwarf"

Bibliography

 
 
 
 University Press of Kansas The GI's Rabbi (2004), Edited by Greg Palmer and Mark S. Zaid,

References

External links 
 Greg Palmer Biography and professional achievements – a good resource for Greg's many talents and contributions
 Articles by Greg Palmer (2007–2008) at Crosscut
 KING 5 video The best of Greg Palmer
 KCTS 9 video Remembering Greg Palmer
 NATAS NW 2009 Silver Circle Inductee Greg Palmer
 Seattle Weekly blog Greg Palmer, RIP (2009)
 Seattle Weekly Memories of a company town, by Greg Palmer (2001)
 University Press of Kansas The GI's Rabbi (2004), Edited by Greg Palmer and Mark S. Zaid, 

Emmy Award winners
1947 births
2009 deaths
20th-century American journalists
American male journalists